The Curzon Mayfair Cinema is a Grade II listed building at 37–38 Curzon Street, London W1, built in 1963–66 by H. G. Hammond for Sir John Burnet, Tait and Partners, architects.

Historic England have described it as "the finest surviving cinema building of the post-war period, it is also the least altered." It is part of the Curzon Cinemas chain.

Closure threat
Several years ago the cinema faced closure due to legal action from the property developer, 38 Curzon Limited, over an issue stating that noise from the cinema could be heard on the two floors above. Rob Kenny, a Curzon director, said at the time that they could "never obtain approval for as the auditorium and surrounding walls are listed".

The issue was resolved after a petition as well as an intervention by mayor Sadiq Khan.

References

External links
 Official website

Grade II listed buildings in the City of Westminster
Cinemas in London